Stanisław Sarnicki (coat of arms: Ślepowron) (1532–1597) was a Polish historian and Calvinist. He lived his life in Mokrelipie, dying there in 1597.

Personal background 
During voyages to Europe, Sarnicki was listener of Philipp Melanchthon in Wittenberg and teaching of John Calvin in Geneva.

Published works 
 Sarnicki, Stanisław Roczniki, czyli o pochodzeniu i sprawach Polaków i Litwinów Ksiąg VIII (Annales, sive de origine et rebus gestis Polonorum et Lithuanorum libri VIII) 1587
 Sarnicki, Stanisław. O początku i o dawnych królach narodu Wandalów to iest Polaków
 Sarnicki, Stanisław. Stanislai Sarnicii Annales sive de origine et rebus gestis Polonorum et Lithuanorum libri octo Cracoviae, 1587
 Sarnicki, Stanisław. Statuta i metryka przywilejów koronnych, Kraków 1594

References 

16th-century Polish historians
Polish male non-fiction writers
Polish nobility
Polish male writers
Polish Calvinist and Reformed Christians
1532 births
1597 deaths